The Type 77A1 is a submachine gun of Taiwanese origin.

References

9mm Parabellum submachine guns
Telescoping bolt submachine guns
Firearms of the Republic of China
Military equipment introduced in the 1980s